is a Japanese  (spirit) found in a number of Japanese legends.

As well as appearing in Japanese folklore, the  has also been depicted numerous times in traditional Japanese art; examples include one depiction of  found in Toriyama Sekien's {{|e-hon}} tetralogy .

In folk legends
Appearances and stories of the  also appear in other areas, such as Haibara District, Shizuoka Prefecture.

Nagano Prefecture
In Nagano Prefecture, a few variants of the  legend exist.

Shizuoka Prefecture
In Shizuoka Prefecture, it is said that in spring, children who come home late around the time of sunset and run across a wheat field may be kidnapped by an  appearing from the wheat. The legend is used in part as a reason for not letting children out into the fields at evening in springtime.

Okayama Prefecture

Yamaguchi Prefecture
In Yamaguchi Prefecture,  are said to be mountain gods who have taken on the appearance of a small priest.

Kagawa Prefecture
In Kagawa Prefecture,  are said to appear before women and ask, "how about hanging your neck?". In this legend, the  disappears if rejected, but if the woman ignores them without saying anything, the  forcefully attack the woman, rendering her unconscious before hanging her by the neck.

Yamagata Prefecture
In this legend, the face of a priest with a blue head appears from the toilet and stares at whoever is using it.

Fukushima Prefecture
Similar to Yamagata Prefecture, in Fukushima Prefecture, in the first half of the 1930s, it is said that an  would appear in an elementary school bathroom, and it is said that the students at the time were so fearful of it, they would not use the toilet.

In urban legends
Beginning in the Shōwa period, urban legends and school horror tales featuring the  became popular.

In the 

In Sekien Toriyama's tetralogy , a potential depiction of an  shows it as a one-eyed priest standing next to a thatched hut.

See also 
 
 List of legendary creatures from Japan

References 

Yōkai
Japanese words and phrases